Burmese curry refers to a diverse array of dishes in Burmese cuisine that consist of protein or vegetables simmered or stewed in an aromatic curry base  Burmese curries generally differ from other Southeast Asian curries (e.g., Thai curry) in that Burmese curries make use of dried spices in addition to fresh herbs and aromatics, and are often milder. Burmese curries are readily available in curry houses throughout the country. They are traditionally accompanied with rice and a variety of side dishes, soups, and Burmese salads called athoke. Burmese curries may also be paired with Indian breads like nanbya, palata, aloo puri, and toshay.

Ingredients 
A curry base of fresh aromatics including onions, shallots, garlic, chilis, ginger, and turmeric powder is typically used to prepare most Burmese curries. Dried spices such as paprika, chili powder, spice mixes like garam masala (generically called masala in Burmese) also feature in many Burmese curries. The Burmese masala spice blend typically consists of ground cinnamon or cassia, cardamon, cloves, and black pepper.

The curry base and dried spices are then fried in heated oil, in a process called hsi that. Some Burmese curries also require the use of fresh herbs, such as lemongrass, curry leaf, pyindawthein, and fresh tamarind paste. Shan and Kachin curries make more liberal use of fresh herbs such as galangal and sawtooth coriander. Burmese curries are generally seasoned using fish sauce, salt, or ngapi (fermented shrimp or fish paste), and are traditionally cooked in a blend of peanut oil and sesame oil.

Terminology 
The Burmese language does not have a single word for "curry;" the closest approximation is the word hin, which is used to describe protein-based dishes eaten with rice. Burmese curries can be generally categorized by cooking technique, used ingredients, or region.

The most common variety is called hsibyan, which is typified by a layer of oil that separates from the gravy and meat after cooked. The name itself refers to the cooking technique that is used. In hsibyan, the curry ingredients are simmered in a combination of water and oil until the water has completely boiled off, leaving a layer of oil that separates and rises to the top, which enables the raw and potent curry paste ingredients to properly blend and become milder in taste. Another common variety of curries is called hnat, in which gamier proteins like goat are braised or slowly simmered. The names of other Burmese curries are typically suffixed with –hin or –chet.

List of Burmese curries 

The repertoire of Burmese curries has not been codified. Common variations of Burmese curries are listed below.

Pork 

 Pork sibyan – classic Burmese curry with fatty cuts of pork
Pork hnat – a sweetened pork curry braised with vinegar and soy sauce
 Pork and pickled mango curry – a sour and sweet pork curry cooked with pickled mangoes
 Pork tripe sibyan – a curry of pork intestines and viscera (kaliza)
 Red braised pork curry – a sweet braised curry of caramelized pork belly and soy sauce similar to Chinese red braised pork belly
 Fermented bean paste pork curry – a curry of pork cooked with pon ye gyi (fermented bean paste)
 Pork and bamboo shoot curry – a sour curry of pork and pickled bamboo shoots
 Pork meatball sibyan – a curry of fried pork meatballs cooked in gravy
Fermented tea leaf pork hnat – a sour and spicy curry of pork braised with lahpet (pickled tea leaves)

Poultry 

 Chicken sibyan – the classic Burmese curry, served with a thick gravy of aromatics
 Bachelor's chicken curry – a red and watery chicken curry cooked with calabash
 Kachin-style chicken curry – an herbal curry of chicken cooked with basil, sawtooth coriander, Vietnamese coriander, and dried metlin bark
 Mon-style chicken curry – a watery chicken curry, cooked with dried marian plum, lemongrass stalks and sawtooth coriander
 Chicken and potato curry – an Indian-inspired curry of chicken and potatoes cooked with a masala spice mix
 Chicken and chickpea curry
 Duck sibyan – a curry of duck cooked with dried spices (e.g., star anise or cumin), and served with a thick gravy of aromatics

Goat and beef 

 Beef hnat – a braised beef curry similar to Indonesian rendang
 Goat hnat – a braised goat curry spiced with masala, cinnamon sticks, bay leaf, and cloves
 Goat and chickpea curry

Fish and seafood 

 Fried fish curry – a curry of deep-fried steak cuts of fish and tomatoes
 Steamed hilsa curry – a curry of hilsa fish and tomatoes, which is slowly simmered to melt the fish bones
 Sardine curry – a curry of sardines cooked with tomatoes
 Prawn sibyan – a curry of whole prawns cooked in a sibyan gravy and shrimp oil, similar to tomalley
 Snakefish intestine sibyan – a curry of striped snakefish intestines
 Eel sibyan
Catfish and morinda sibyan – a curry of walking catfish and morinda leaves

Other 

 Egg curry – a sour curry made with hardboiled duck or chicken eggs, cooked in tamarind paste and mashed tomatoes
 Eggplant curry – a curry of slow-cooked eggplants and tomatoes
 Lablab bean hnat – a curry of braised lablab beans
 Roselle curry – a sour curry of roselle leaves, bamboo shoots, and dried shrimp
 Khayan thi ngachauk chet – aubergine cooked lightly with a small amount of oil, with dried fish and chilli
 Kima palata – a paratha stuffed with curried ground meat (keema)
Pyay palata – a salad of paratha, chicken and potato curry, and raw onions
 Tofu curry – Sliced Burmese tofu curried with fresh tomatoes, onions and garlic, cooked in peanut oil and fish sauce, and garnished with coriander and green chilli

Noodle curries 
Specially prepared curries also form the base for several Burmese noodle dishes, including:

 Ohn no khauk swe – a coconut milk noodle soup, served in a broth of chicken curry
 Shwedaung khauk swe – a dry noodle dish of egg noodles, served with chicken curry and coconut milk
 Nangyi thoke – a salad of thick rice noodles, mixed with chicken curry and gravy
 Panthay khauk swe – a fried noodle dish of Chinese Muslim origin, served with a chicken curry cooked in a blend of spices including cardamom, cloves, star anise, and bay leaf

References

See also 

 Burmese cuisine
 Kaeng hang le

Burmese cuisine
Burmese culture
Food paste
Curry